The Acadia Axemen football team represents Acadia University in Wolfville, Nova Scotia in the sport of Canadian football in U Sports. The team has been in continuous operation since 1957 when they played their first full season in the Nova Scotia Junior Canadian Football League. The program entered the top tier in Maritime football in 1962 and has been competing there ever since. The program saw its greatest success from 1975 to 1981 where they won six conference championships, appeared in four Vanier Cup national championships, and won two of those in 1979 and in 1981.

Recently, the Axemen had their most success in the 2011, 2012, 2017, and 2019 seasons, when the teams finished first in the AUS and reached the Uteck Bowl all four years. Since 1998, the program has qualified for the playoffs every year except for the 2008 and 2022 seasons.

Recent regular season results

National championships

Vanier Cup 
 Champions: 1979, 1981
 Runner Up: 1976, 1977

Semi-final championships

Uteck Bowl 
 Runner Up: 2005, 2006, 2011, 2012, 2017, 2019

Atlantic Bowl 
 Champions: 1976, 1977, 1979, 1981
 Runner Up: 1975, 1980, 1986, 1995, 1998

Conference championships

Jewett Trophy (Loney Bowl) 
 Champions: 1975, 1976, 1977, 1979, 1980, 1981, 1986, 1995, 1998, 2005, 2006, 2011, 2012, 2017, 2019

National award winners
Hec Crighton Trophy: Al Charuk (1974), Bob Stracina (1976), Bob Cameron (1977)
Peter Gorman Trophy: Jerome Pathon (1993)
Frank Tindall Trophy: John Huard (1981), Jeff Cummins (2011, 2017)

Axemen in the CFL
As of the end of the 2022 CFL season, four former Axemen players are on CFL teams' rosters:
Mike Benson, Winnipeg Blue Bombers
Bailey Feltmate, Hamilton Tiger-Cats
Mike Miller, Winnipeg Blue Bombers
Jake Thomas, Winnipeg Blue Bombers

External links

References

U Sports football teams
Acadia Axemen football
Sports teams in Nova Scotia